The 1978 Tournament Players Championship was a golf tournament in Florida on the PGA Tour, held March 16–19 at Sawgrass Country Club in Ponte Vedra Beach, southeast of Jacksonville. The fifth Tournament Players Championship, it was the second at Sawgrass and Jack Nicklaus won his third TPC title at 289 (+1), one stroke ahead of runner-up Lou Graham. Both shot  in the windy final round and Nicklaus went without a birdie.

This was the fourth consecutive start for Nicklaus in 1978 that ended with a top-two finish: two wins and two second places.

Defending champion Mark Hayes finished eleven strokes back, in a tie for 28th place.

Venue

This was the second of five Tournament Players Championships held at Sawgrass Country Club; it moved to the nearby TPC at Sawgrass Stadium Course in 1982.

Eligibility requirements 
All designated players
Winners of major PGA Tour co-sponsored or approved events beginning with the 1977 Tournament Players Championship and concluding with the tournament immediately preceding the 1978 TPC
The current British Open champion
Leaders In PGA Tour Official Standings as necessary to complete the field, beginning with the 1977 Tournament Players Championship and concluding with the tournament scheduled to end on the Sunday immediately preceding the 1978 TPC, the Florida Citrus Open

Source:

Field
Tommy Aaron, Sam Adams, Wally Armstrong, Butch Baird, Miller Barber, Andy Bean, Frank Beard, Don Bies, Homero Blancas, George Burns, George Cadle, Rex Caldwell, Bill Calfee, Billy Casper, Antonio Cerda Jr., Jim Colbert, Bobby Cole, Frank Conner, Charles Coody, Ben Crenshaw, Rod Curl, Jim Dent, Bruce Devlin, Terry Diehl, Ed Dougherty, Bob Eastwood, Danny Edwards, Dave Eichelberger, Lee Elder, Randy Erskine, Keith Fergus, Forrest Fezler, Raymond Floyd, Rod Funseth, Gibby Gilbert, Bob Gilder, David Graham, Lou Graham, Hubert Green, Gary Groh, Jay Haas, Phil Hancock, Morris Hatalsky, Dale Hayes, Mark Hayes, Jerry Heard, Mike Hill, Lon Hinkle, Joe Inman, Hale Irwin, Don Iverson, Peter Jacobsen, Barry Jaeckel, Don January, Tom Jenkins, Grier Jones, Tom Kite, George Knudson, Gary Koch, Billy Kratzert, Stan Lee, Wayne Levi, Bruce Lietzke, John Lister, Gene Littler, Lyn Lott, Mark Lye, John Mahaffey, Bill Mallon, Roger Maltbie, Graham Marsh, Fred Marti, Rik Massengale, Gary McCord, Mike McCullough, Jerry McGee, Mac McLendon, Artie McNickle, Steve Melnyk, Allen Miller, Johnny Miller, Jeff Mitchell, Florentino Molina, Orville Moody, Gil Morgan, Mike Morley, Bob Murphy, Larry Nelson, Dwight Nevil, Bobby Nichols, Jack Nicklaus, Andy North, Peter Oosterhuis, Arnold Palmer, Jerry Pate, Bob Payne, Eddie Pearce, Calvin Peete, Mark Pfeil, Gary Player, Don Pooley, Joe Porter, Tom Purtzer, Sammy Rachels, Victor Regalado, Mike Reid, Jack Renner, Chi Chi Rodriguez, Bill Rogers, John Schlee, John Schroeder, Tom Shaw, Bob Shearer, Dan Sikes, Jim Simons, Tim Simpson, Bob E. Smith, J. C. Snead, Ed Sneed, Craig Stadler, Ken Still, Dave Stockton, Curtis Strange, Ron Streck, Alan Tapie, Steve Taylor, Doug Tewell, Barney Thompson, Leonard Thompson, Lee Trevino, Howard Twitty, Bobby Wadkins, Lanny Wadkins, Art Wall Jr., Bobby Walzel, Tom Watson, Tom Weiskopf, Bob Wynn, Kermit Zarley, Bob Zender, Larry Ziegler, Fuzzy Zoeller

Round summaries

First round
Thursday, March 16, 1978

Source:

Second round
Friday, March 17, 1978

Source:

Third round
Saturday, March 18, 1978

Source:

Final round
Sunday, March 19, 1978

References

External links
The Players Championship website

1978
1978 in golf
1978 in American sports
1978 in sports in Florida
March 1978 sports events in the United States